Trimerotropis occulens, the Lompoc grasshopper, is a species of grasshopper in the family Acrididae. It is endemic to the United States.

References 

Oedipodinae
Orthoptera of North America
Insects of the United States
Taxonomy articles created by Polbot